UFC 12: Judgement Day was a mixed martial arts event held by the Ultimate Fighting Championship on February 7, 1997 at the Dothan Civic Center in Dothan, Alabama. The event was seen live on pay per view in the United States, and later released on home video.

History
UFC 12 was the first UFC event to feature weight classes; heavyweights (200 lb and over) and lightweights (under 200 lb) battled in two separate mini tournaments, each consisting of two semifinal bouts and a finals match. 

The event also featured a Superfight between Dan Severn and Mark Coleman. The fight would unify the UFC Superfight Championship with the UFC tournament championship and determine the first ever UFC Heavyweight Champion. Mark Coleman was a late substitution for Don Frye, who had earned the rematch with Severn after winning the Ultimate Ultimate 1996, but was unable to participate in UFC 12 because of injuries he had suffered in that previous event. Frye never returned to the UFC. "Judgement Day" also featured two alternate bouts in case of tournament injury. 

UFC 12 marked the first UFC appearance of Vitor Belfort, who won the heavyweight tournament and was only 19 years of age. UFC 12 also marked the first appearance of commentator Joe Rogan, who handled backstage interviews for the event and interviewed the winners of the main events.

After being removed from many pay per view carriers, and with mounting pressure from politicians such as Senator John McCain, the UFC had continuing troubles finding a venue, and a state, that would host UFC 12.It was first announced that UFC 12 would be held in Niagara Falls, New York, to which it was ultimately denied sanctioning rights. Next, it was announced that UFC 12 would be held in Oregon, which soon banned the event. Finally, the UFC returned to Alabama, where it appeared in the small city of Dothan, located about 200 miles southeast of Birmingham. 

The UFC would continue to hold events exclusively in Southern US States (aside from occasional shows in Japan and Brazil) until 2001, when the UFC was sanctioned by the New Jersey State Athletic Commission.

Results

UFC 12 Lightweight Tournament Bracket

a.  Nick Sanzo replaced Yoshiki Takahashi.

UFC 12 Heavyweight Tournament Bracket

See also 
 Ultimate Fighting Championship
 List of UFC champions
 List of UFC events
 1997 in UFC

References

External links
UFC 12 results at Sherdog.com
UFC 12 fights reviews
Official UFC website

Ultimate Fighting Championship events
1997 in mixed martial arts
Mixed martial arts in Alabama
Sports in Dothan, Alabama
1997 in Alabama